The 11th National Winter Games of the People's Republic of China were held in Qiqihar from the 17-Jan to the 27-Jan, 2008. The snow events were held at nearby Yabuli. A total of 92 gold medals were handed out in a number of winter sports.

Sports
Competitions included:
Ice hockey
Figure skating
Short-track speed skating
Curling
Ski jumping
Cross-country skiing
Downhill skiing
Freestyle skiing

Participating units
This event is set up on city or district lines.

External links
 Picture gallery from Show China

Sources

National Games of China
2008 in Chinese sport
2008 in winter sports
2008 in multi-sport events